Qualification for shooting at the 2020 Summer Paralympics begins from 1 January 2019 to 21 June 2021. There were three events for male and female sports shooters and seven mixed events. There were a total of 154 athlete quotas (65 male, 54 female, 35 gender free).

Timeline
Detailed direct allocation slots are listed in the qualification slots section.

Qualification requirements

Eligibility scores
Each athlete from each NPC must at least aim to score targets in each medalling event in the qualifying tournaments.

Summary

Qualification slots
An NPC can:
 Enter a maximum of three eligible athletes per medaling event.
 Allocate a maximum of twelve qualification slots, maximum of eight of any gender.
 Qualification slots are allocated to the NPCs, not to the individual athlete however in Bipartite Commission Invitation, the slot is allocated to the individual athlete not to the NPC.

Pistol
As of June 2021.
P1 - Men's 10m Air Pistol SH1

P2 - Women's 10m Air Pistol SH1

P3 - Mixed 25m Pistol SH1

P4 - Mixed 50m Pistol SH1

Rifle
R1 - Men's 10m Air Rifle Standing SH1

R2 - Women's 10m Air Rifle Standing SH1

R3 - Mixed 10m Air Rifle Prone SH1

R4 - Mixed 10m Air Rifle Standing SH2

R5 - Mixed 10m Air Rifle Prone SH2

R6 - Mixed 50m Rifle Prone SH1

R7 - Men's 50m Rifle 3 Positions

R8 - Women's 50m Rifle 3 Positions

R9 - Mixed 50m Rifle Prone SH2

See also
Shooting at the 2020 Summer Olympics – Qualification

References

Paralympics
Qualification